Philip Farkas (March 5, 1914 – December 21, 1992) was the principal French horn player in the Chicago Symphony Orchestra for many years, and he left in 1960 to join the music faculty at Indiana University Bloomington.  His books include The Art of French Horn Playing (considered the field's seminal work), The Art of Brass Playing, The Art of Musicianship, and A Photo Study of 40 Virtuoso Horn Players' Embouchures. Nancy Jordan Fako wrote his biography, Philip Farkas and His Horn - A Happy, Worthwhile Life. Later in his life he helped design the Holton Farkas horn.

Life
Farkas was born on March 5, 1914, in Chicago to Anna Cassidy Farkas and Emil Nelson Farkas. March 5 is called the Horn Duumvirate Date, as it is the birth date of both Farkas and Barry Tuckwell, two great horn players of the 20th century. His parents were ignorant about music, but his mother encouraged him to take piano lessons as his introduction to music. Around the age of twelve his Boy Scout troop needed a bugler, so he volunteered. He sought tutoring from a neighbor who played the trumpet, and soon became very good. Around the age of fourteen he started to develop asthma. His parents thought it would be best if he played a wind instrument in band, but the school only had a bass drum and a tuba available at the moment, so he chose the tuba.

Farkas had to take a street car to school, and the conductor began to complain at the tuba's size. Farkas asked him what instrument would be more convenient and the conductor pointed to a horn case belonging to a band that was on the street. Soon after, Farkas and his father went to downtown Chicago and rented a Schmidt horn for three dollars a month.

After playing for a while, he pursued a profession as a horn player. While still in high school, he became the youngest member of the All-Chicago High School Orchestra, first horn player in the Chicago Civic Orchestra, and first horn in the Kansas City Philharmonic as his first professional horn debut.

He played first chair in the Chicago Symphony, Boston, and Cleveland orchestras, as the only player ever offered the solo horn positions in these three major orchestras and the youngest principal player in the Chicago Symphony Orchestra. Farkas was a music professor at Indiana University, Northwestern University, Cleveland Institute, Kansas City Conservatory, De Paul University, and Roosevelt University. His pupils included Douglas Hill and Paul Marcotte.

Farkas held many clinics and performed as a soloist nationwide. He founded the Wind Music Inc. publishing company. He partnered with Chicago trumpeter Renold Schilke in the founding of Schilke Music Products and as consultants to the musical instrument division of Yamaha. He received a doctorate in music, presented by Eastern Michigan University in April 1978.

He designed the top-selling Holton-Farkas horn made by the Frank Holton Company and a large selection of mouthpieces. He wrote and published four best-selling books to help French horn players, brass players, and all musicians improve in the art. His first book, The Art of French Horn Playing, is nicknamed the bible of horn players.

He continued to practice his horn every day until his death on December 21, 1992, at the age of 78.

See also
Embouchure

References

Published works

Biography

External links
Website about the Holton Farkas horn
Biography from the International Horn Society
Biography from IU Cook Music Library

1914 births
1992 deaths
American classical horn players
20th-century classical musicians
20th-century American musicians
Summit Records artists